The 2013 Liga Indonesia Premier Division Final is a scheduled football match played on 14 September 2013 at the Manahan Stadium in Surakarta, Indonesia, to determine the winner of 2013 Liga Indonesia Premier Division. This round will bring together two of the best teams the East Java club Persebaya DU (Bhayangkara) with his opponent from Papua Perseru Serui. Persebaya DU (Bhayangkara) advanced to the finals after conquering Persikabo Bogor with a score of 4-1, while Perseru overcame Persik Kediri in a shootout with the final score ending 5-4 after extra time when normal and half ended with the score 2-2.

Persebaya DU (Bhayangkara)  claim his first title in Premier Division after defeat Perseru Serui 2-0 in this Final.

Route to the Final

Match

References 

Final
2013